Benni Ljungbeck (born 20 July 1958) is a Swedish wrestler. He was born in Skåne. He won an Olympic bronze medal in Greco-Roman wrestling in 1980. He also competed at the 1984 and 1988 Olympics.

References

External links
 

1958 births
Living people
Olympic wrestlers of Sweden
Wrestlers at the 1980 Summer Olympics
Wrestlers at the 1984 Summer Olympics
Wrestlers at the 1988 Summer Olympics
Swedish male sport wrestlers
Olympic bronze medalists for Sweden
Olympic medalists in wrestling
Medalists at the 1980 Summer Olympics
20th-century Swedish people